The National Federation of Energy (FNE-CGT) was a trade union representing workers in the energy industry, in France.

The union was founded in 1905 as the National Federation of Lighting Workers, affiliated to the General Confederation of Labour (CGT), and mostly represented gas workers.  In 1919, it was joined by various unions representing electrical workers, which had previously been part of the National Federation of Metalworkers, and it renamed itself as the National Federation of Lighting and Motive Force Workers.  Following lengthy debates, the union decided not to affiliate to the Red Trade Union International.

The union split in 1939 into legal and underground wings, with the underground wing soon becoming the larger.  The legal wing was largely supportive of the Vichy government until 1943, enabling a reunification in September 1944, largely on the terms of the underground wing.  In 1946, the union played an important role in the campaign for the nationalisation of the electricity and gas industries.  In 1947, the right wing of the union split away, to form the National Federation of Trade Unions of the Electric and Gas Industries.

In 1989, the National Union of Atomic Energy Trade Unions joined the union.  In 1999, it merged with the National Federation of Miners, forming the National Federation of Mines and Energy.

General Secretaries
1905: Maurice Claverie
1906:
1919: E. Jacquot
1921: Charles Biot
1936: Charles Biot and Raoul Lèbre
1936: Lucien Barthes
1937: Marcel Paul
1941: Émile Pasquier
1942: Fernand Gambier
1946: Émile Pasquier
1956: Marcel Paul
1963: Roger Pauwels
1979: François Duteil
1989: Denis Cohen

References

Trade unions established in 1905
Trade unions disestablished in 1999
Trade unions in France
Energy industry trade unions
1999 disestablishments in France
1905 establishments in France